Roger Luk Koon-ho, BBS, JP (born 10 August 1951, Hong Kong) was a member of the Legislative Council of Hong Kong (1992–95) and the Assistant General Manager of the Hang Seng Bank.

References

1951 births
Living people
Alumni of the Chinese University of Hong Kong
Hong Kong financial businesspeople
Alumni of the University of Hong Kong
HK LegCo Members 1991–1995
Recipients of the Bronze Bauhinia Star